PVS-Studio is a proprietary static code analyzer on guard of code quality, security, and code safety supporting C, C++, C++11, C++/CLI, C++/CX, C# and Java.

PVS‑Studio detects various errors typos, dead code, and potential vulnerabilities (static application security testing, or SAST), the analyzer matches warnings to the common weakness enumeration, SEI CERT coding standards, and supports the MISRA standard. PVS‑Studio warning classifications for various standards:

 CVE (common weakness enumeration)
 SEI CERT coding standard
 MISRA
 OWASP application security verification standard

PVS-Studio supports integration with the most diverse development tools and compilation systems, as Visual Studio 2022, IntelliJ IDEA, Rider, CLion, VSCode, Qt Creator, Eclipse, MSBuild, CMake, Make, Ninja, Gradle, Maven, Azure DevOps, Unity, and Unreal 5.

See also
 List of tools for static code analysis
Security testing

References 

Static program analysis tools
Proprietary software
Windows software
Linux software
2006 software